Stephanie Devaux-Lovell (born September 8, 1995) is a Saint Lucian sailor. She placed 29th in the Laser Radial event at the 2016 Summer Olympics.

References

1995 births
Living people
Saint Lucian female sailors (sport)
Olympic sailors of Saint Lucia
Sailors at the 2016 Summer Olympics – Laser Radial
Sailors at the 2010 Summer Youth Olympics
Sailors at the 2015 Pan American Games
Sailors at the 2019 Pan American Games
Pan American Games competitors for Saint Lucia
Sailors at the 2020 Summer Olympics – Laser Radial